Yadiel Hernández (born October 9, 1987) is a Cuban professional baseball outfielder in the Washington Nationals organization. He previously played in the Cuban National Series for Cocodrilos de Matanzas.

Career
Hernández began his baseball career with the Cocodrilos in 2009. After hitting .369 for Matanzas in the 2014–15 Cuban National Series, Hernández defected to the United States at age 28 along with Cuban national teammate Luis Yander La O in June 2015, while they were in North Carolina for a game against American college baseball players. Hernández was declared eligible to sign with a Major League Baseball team in April 2016. In September 2016, the Washington Nationals, not usually a major player for Cuban talent, signed him to a minor league deal with a $200,000 signing bonus.

After playing for the Class-AA Harrisburg Senators in 2017 and 2018, Hernández was promoted to Class-AAA. He hit his first professional grand slam on May 9, 2019, for the Fresno Grizzlies of the Pacific Coast League. Along with teammate Dakota Bacus, he represented Fresno in the 2019 Triple-A All-Star Game.

At age 32, Hernández was called up to the major leagues for the first time on September 10, 2020, after Nationals infielder Howie Kendrick was placed on the injured list. He made his major league debut that day against the Atlanta Braves.

In 2021, he batted .273/.329/.413 with 9 home runs and 32 RBIs in 112 games. He had the slowest sprint speed of all major league left fielders, at 25.3 feet/second. He was sent outright off the 40-man roster on November 15, 2022.

References

External links

1987 births
Living people
Cangrejeros de Santurce (baseball) players
Cuban expatriate baseball players in Puerto Rico
Cocodrilos de Matanzas players
Defecting Cuban baseball players
Estrellas Orientales players
Cuban expatriate baseball players in the Dominican Republic
Fresno Grizzlies players
Harrisburg Senators players
Liga de Béisbol Profesional Roberto Clemente outfielders
Major League Baseball outfielders
Major League Baseball players from Cuba
Cuban expatriate baseball players in the United States
Naranjeros de Hermosillo players
Cuban expatriate baseball players in Mexico
Rochester Red Wings players
Sportspeople from Matanzas
Washington Nationals players